Kim Song-hui (born 25 November 1968) is a male North Korean former international table tennis player.

He won a bronze medal at the 1987 World Table Tennis Championships and 1989 World Table Tennis Championships in the men's team event. Two years later he won another bronze medal at the 1991 in the mixed doubles with Ri Pun-hui as part of the unified Korean team. He also competed at the 1992 Summer Olympics and the 1996 Summer Olympics.

He married Ri on 27 September 1992 in a ceremony in Pyongyang after getting engaged to her in June that year.

See also
 List of table tennis players

References

1968 births
Living people
North Korean male table tennis players
Asian Games medalists in table tennis
Table tennis players at the 1990 Asian Games
Table tennis players at the 1998 Asian Games
Table tennis players at the 2002 Asian Games
Asian Games silver medalists for North Korea
Asian Games bronze medalists for North Korea
Medalists at the 1990 Asian Games
Medalists at the 1998 Asian Games
World Table Tennis Championships medalists
Olympic table tennis players of North Korea
Table tennis players at the 1992 Summer Olympics
Table tennis players at the 1996 Summer Olympics
20th-century North Korean people